Annick Sevenans (born 10 December 1986 in Athens) is a retired Belgian wheelchair tennis player who competed in international level events. She was a runner-up at the 2009 French Open where she partnered with Aniek Van Koot and lost to Korie Homan and Esther Vergeer.

References

External links
 
 

1986 births
Living people
Sportspeople from Athens
Paralympic wheelchair tennis players of Belgium
Wheelchair tennis players at the 2012 Summer Paralympics
Belgian female tennis players
Greek emigrants to Belgium
Wheelchair tennis players at the 2008 Summer Paralympics
People with paraplegia
21st-century Belgian women